Potty parity is equal or equitable provision of public toilet facilities for females and males within a public space.

Definition of parity
Parity may be defined in various ways in relation to facilities in a building.  The simplest is as equal floorspace for male and female washrooms. Since men's and boys' bathrooms include urinals, which take up less space than stalls, this still results in more facilities for males. An alternative parity is by number of fixtures within washrooms.  However, since females on average spend more time in washrooms more males are able to use more facilities per unit time. More recent parity regulations therefore require more fixtures for females to ensure that the average time spent waiting to use the toilet is the same for females as for males, or to equalise throughputs of male and female toilets.

Sex differences
Women and girls often spend more time in washrooms than men and boys, for both physiological and cultural reasons. The requirement to use a cubicle rather than a urinal means urination takes longer and hand washing must be done more thoroughly. Females also make more visits to washrooms. Urinary tract infections and incontinence are more common in females. Pregnancy, menstruation, breastfeeding, and diaper-changing increase usage.  The elderly, who are disproportionately female, take longer and more frequent bathroom visits.

A variety of female urinals and personal funnels have been invented to make it easier for females to urinate standing up. None has become widespread enough to affect policy formation on potty parity.

John F. Banzhaf III, a law professor at George Washington University, calls himself the "father of potty parity."  Banzhaf argues that to ignore potty parity; that is, to have merely equal facilities for males and females; constitutes a form of sex discrimination against women. In the 1970s the Committee to End Pay Toilets in America made a similar point: that allowing toilet providers to charge for the use of a cubicle while urinals required no money was unfair to females.

Several authors have identified potty parity as a potential rallying issue for feminism, saying all women can identify with it.

History and developments

U.S. 
The first bathroom for congresswomen in the United States Capitol was opened in 1962.

Segregation of toilet facilities by race was outlawed in the United States by the Civil Rights Act of 1964. Provision of disabled-access facilities was mandated in federal buildings by the Architectural Barriers Act of 1968 and in private buildings by the Americans with Disabilities Act of 1990. No federal legislation relates to provision of facilities for women.  The banning of pay toilets came about because women/girls had to pay to urinate whereas men/boys only had to pay to defecate.

In many older buildings, little or no provision was made for women because few would work in or visit them. Increased gender equality in employment and other spheres of life has impelled change. Until the 1980s, building codes for stadiums in the United States stipulated more toilets for men, on the assumption that most sports fans were male.

In 1973, to protest the lack of female bathrooms at Harvard University, women poured jars of fake urine on the steps of the University's Lowell Hall, a protest Florynce Kennedy thought of and participated in.

The first "Restroom Equity" Act in the United States was passed in California in 1989.  It was introduced by then-Senator Arthur Torres after several long waits for his wife to return from the bathroom.

Facilities for female U.S. senators on the Senate Chamber level were first provided in 1992.

Nissan Stadium in Nashville, Tennessee was built in 1999 in compliance with the Tennessee Equitable Restrooms Act, providing 288 fixtures for men and 580 for women.  The Tennessean reported fifteen-minute waits at some men's rooms, compared to none at women's rooms. The Act was amended in 2000 to empower the state architect to authorize extra men's rooms at stadiums, horse shows and auto racing venues.

In 2011 the U.S. House of Representatives got its first women’s bathroom near the chamber (Room H-211 of the U.S. Capitol). It is only open to women lawmakers, not the public.

Regulations
Current laws in the United Kingdom require a 1:1 female–male ratio of restroom space in public buildings.  The International Building Code requires range of female to male ratio of toilets depending on the building occupancy. Most occupancies require 1:1 ratio, but Assembly uses can require up to 2:1 ratio of female to male toilets. New York City Council passed a law in 2005 requiring roughly this in all public buildings. An advisory ruling had been passed in 2003. U.S. state laws vary between 1:1, 3:2, and 2:1 ratios. The Uniform Plumbing Code specifies a 4:1 ratio in movie theaters.

Gender-neutral toilets

Gender-neutral toilets are common in some contexts, including on aircraft, on trains or buses, portable toilets, and accessible toilets. In parts of Europe they are also common in buildings. In the United States, they began to appear in the 2000s on university campuses and in some upmarket restaurants.

In 2013, the state of California passed bill 1266 ("The School Success and Opportunity Act") requiring provision of facilities consistent with a pupil's gender identity.

Examples

India 
In 2011 a "Right to Pee" (as called by the media) campaign began in Mumbai, India's largest city. Women, but not men, have to pay to urinate in Mumbai, despite regulations against this practice. Women have also been sexually assaulted while urinating in fields. Thus, activists have collected more than 50,000 signatures supporting their demands that the local government stop charging women to urinate, build more toilets, keep them clean, provide sanitary napkins and a trash can, and hire female attendants. In response, city officials have agreed to build hundreds of public toilets for women in Mumbai, and some local legislators are now promising to build toilets for women in every one of their districts.

China 
On 19 February 2012, some Chinese women in Guangzhou protested against the inequitable waiting times. This movement has drifted to Beijing, calling for women's facilities to be proportionally larger to accommodate the longer use times and ameliorate the longer queues of females. Since March 2011, Guangzhou's urban-management commission has ordered that new and newly renovated female public toilets must be 1.5 times the size of their male counterparts. The aforementioned movement is pressing for the regulation to be applied retroactively.

See also 

 Bathroom bill

References

Toilets
Feminism and health
Women's rights
Gender equality